Pizzocco is a mountain of the Veneto, Italy. It has an elevation of 2,187 metres.

Mountains of the Alps
Dolomites
Mountains of Veneto